Doaba is a small city located in Tall tehsil, Hangu district, Pakistan. Its population is just above 20,000, but the city has only 1,942 households. The most spoken language in Doaba is Pashto. Doaba is Hangu district's third-largest city.

Doaba has beautiful hills and is covered by a lot of trees. The major tribes living in Doaba are Khakhil, (Thorghali and Sarghali), Tarkon, Ferozkhail, Merikhail, MandraKhail, Mazanih, Haider Khail, Qureshi, Sarozi, and the Paracha family.

In the mountains is the tomb of a famous religious scholar named Ghani Nikah. It is rumoured that he paid the land price in 1650 when he migrated from Afghanistan to Doaba. (A rich Malik family from Laghman state of Afghanistan migrated during the Afghan war with the Mughal empire in 1638)

There are many shopping markets along with other facilities in Doaba. People from surrounding areas come here for shopping.

In the previous two decades, Doaba was known for the area of education. The Doaba public school is an educational institution in the area.

Big stones, Sweery Ghar (mountain), Chaman, Jangalat, Kautaro Kandao, Zaraa Korna, and Khalwati Cheena are well-known picnic places.

In Doaba, fruits are prepared according to season including apricots, watermelons, plums, grapes, almonds, strawberries, and peanuts. The fruits that are naturally grown are tut and mulberry.  

KHAN NASIR,,

See also 
 List of cities in Khyber Pakhtunkhwa by population
 Kohat Division
 Hangu District
 Hangu
 Tall
 Darsamand
 Karak District
 Karak
 Kohat District
 Kohat
 Lachi
 Shakardara
 Kurram District
 Parachinar
 Sadda
 Orakzai District
 Pashto

References

Union councils of Hangu District
Populated places in Hangu District, Pakistan